The Phantom Speaks is a 1945 American supernatural film noir directed by John English and written by John K. Butler. The film stars Richard Arlen, Stanley Ridges, Lynne Roberts, Tom Powers, Charlotte Wynters and Jonathan Hale. The film was released on May 10, 1945, by Republic Pictures.

Plot
Harvey Bogardus kills a man whom he thinks is having an affair with his wife. After he is sentenced to the electric chair, reporter Matt Fraser is assigned to speak with Dr. Renwick, who is interviewing Bogardus. Matt is dating Renwick's daughter, and agrees. Renwick has a theory that strong-willed souls can survive death, and that Bogardus will do just that. Bogardus is executed. That night, Bogardus' spirit appears and takes over Renwick's mind. "Renwick" shoots and kills the attorney who represented him at trial, accusing him of incompetence. Matt and the police discover that the attorney was using his dictaphone at the time of his death, and Bogardus' voice is on the machine.

The possessed Renwick then kills Bogardus' wife. Renwick, realizing he has large amounts of time he cannot account for, tries to turn himself in but Bogardus once more possesses him. "Renwick" now kills a man who was an eyewitness to Bogardus' crime. Bogardus wants Renwick to kill Matt as well as District Attorney Owen McAllister. Renwick tries to commit suicide, but Bogardus stops him. Matt, thinking Renwick is killing people, goes to McAllister's home to warn him. Matt and McAllister flee in Matt's car, but the possessed Renwick is in the back seat. Matt saves the day, and Renwick is convicted of murder and sentenced to the electric chair.

As Renwick walks to the death chamber, he is still possessed by Bogardus. He speaks in Bogardus' voice, and utters the same last words Bogardus did before his execution. Matt and McAllister, the only witnesses to Bogardus' execution, realize in horror what has happened.

Cast  
Richard Arlen as Matt Fraser
Stanley Ridges as Dr. Paul Renwick
Lynne Roberts as Joan Renwick
Tom Powers as Harvey Bogardus
Charlotte Wynters as Cornelia Wilmont
Jonathan Hale as Owen McAllister
Pierre Watkin as Charlie Davis
Marion Martin as Betty Hanzel 
Garry Owen as Louis Fabian
Ralf Harolde as Frankie Teal
Doreen McCann as Mary Fabian

References

External links 
 

1945 films
American supernatural horror films
1945 horror films
Republic Pictures films
Films directed by John English
American black-and-white films
1940s English-language films
1940s American films